The "Comic Relief special" was a sketch of the BBC sit-com, Only Fools and Horses, recorded as part of the 1997 Comic Relief appeal. It was first screened on 14 March 1997. It was chronologically set after the 1996 Christmas trilogy. This special sketch was Buster Merryfield's final appearance as Uncle Albert as he died not long after.

Synopsis
Sitting around the breakfast table in their flat, Rodney laments that he can't afford a holiday, whilst Del Boy considers signing Damien up for a modelling agency. Albert then suggests that they should be thankful for what they have. Though they are expecting another "During the war..." anecdote, Albert instead mentions the plight of the people of Africa. The show has subtle references to Nicholas Lyndhurst and David Jason's other well-known shows, Goodnight Sweetheart and A Touch of Frost, respectively. It ends with an appeal for donations from Del and Rodney.

Episode cast

1997 British television episodes
Only Fools and Horses special episodes
Comic Relief